Senayan City (also often known as Sen C or Sency) is a mixed-use development located in Senayan area, Central Jakarta, Indonesia. The complex comprises a seven-floor high end shopping mall, two boutique office towers (one occupied by SCTV as their headquarters, one anchored by Panin Bank) and an apartment tower. During construction, premium hotel chain Sofitel had planned to open in Senayan City with an estimated opening for 2007, which was ultimately scrapped. Senayan City is built on a land area of  owned by the Bung Karno Stadium Authority. It is built and managed by Manggala Gelora Perkasa, a subsidiary of Agung Podomoro Group, under the BOT contract for 50 years which starts in 2005. They used Pulau Intan as their main contractor, Structure and mechanical engineering contractor. The development was designed by DP Architects.

The shopping mall, soft opened on 23 June 2006 and grand opened on 21 September 2006.

Gallery

See also

 List of shopping malls in Indonesia

References

Shopping malls in Jakarta
South Jakarta
2006 establishments in Indonesia
Shopping malls established in 2006